Shingirai Winston Masakadza (born 4 September 1986) is a cricketer and former professional footballer from Zimbabwe. The brother of former Zimbabwe cricket captain Hamilton Masakadza, he is a pace bowler and middle-order batsmen. After making his first class debut for Easterns in 2008, he was called up to the Zimbabwe squad to face the West Indies in the Caribbean in February 2010. Before becoming a full-time cricketer, Massakadza played football for Dynamos, one of Zimbabwe's most popular clubs.

In the summer of 2022 Shingi played for Ackworth Cricket Club in the Yorkshire Cricket Southern Premier League. He played a pivotal role in the team getting promoted at the first attempt after winning the division

Domestic career
In December 2020, he was selected to play for the Mountaineers in the 2020–21 Logan Cup.

International career 
He made his ODI debut in Providence, and after Zimbabwe posted a competitive score of 256/5, Shingirai held his nerve in the final over of the match, to take two wickets as Zimbabwe pulled off a 2 run victory, with Masakadza ending with figures of 3/36, taking the wickets of Shivnarine Chanderpaul, Dwayne Smith and Sulieman Benn. He was then announced in the squad that would play Ireland in August 2010. He scored 46 not out as Zimbabwe lost the match but won the series 2–1. Masakadaza was placed in as a replacement for Charles Coventry in that match.

He was subsequently selected for the two match T20 series against South Africa and participated in the Second T20 at the expense of Ed Rainsford. Masakadza clean bowled David Miller and also took the wicket of Robin Peterson against a weakened South Africa who were without Dale Steyn, Jacques Kallis & Morne Morkel. In the subsequent ODI series he took 4 wickets in his opening match the wickets being of Graeme Smith, Colin Ingram, Albie Morkel and David Miller.

Masakadza was included in Zimbabwe's squad for the 2011 World Cup, and played in one match, Zimbabwe's seven-wicket defeat to Pakistan.

He along with Ian Nicolson set the record for the highest last-wicket stand in ODIs for Zimbabwe(60)

References

External links

1986 births
Living people
Mountaineers cricketers
Zimbabwe One Day International cricketers
Zimbabwe Twenty20 International cricketers
Zimbabwean cricketers
Cricketers at the 2011 Cricket World Cup
Zimbabwe Test cricketers
Easterns (Zimbabwe) cricketers
Cricketers from Harare